Kevin Barrow (born San Fernando, Trinidad and Tobago) is a Trinidadian football (soccer) player who currently plays for the Atlanta Silverbacks of the USL First Division.

Barrow played for Hyundai San Fernando Giants from 1995 to 2002, a club in the TT Pro League.  In 2003, Barrow signed with the Atlanta Silverbacks, but saw no first team games until 2008.  He spent the 2003 to 2007 seasons playing for the Silverbacks Reserves.  According to his player profile on the Atlanta Silverbacks’ site, Barrow played for the Brooklyn Knights in 1998.  However, the Knights were not established until 1999.

External links
Atlanta Silverbacks Player Profile

Living people
Atlanta Silverbacks players 
Expatriate soccer players in the United States
Association football forwards
People from San Fernando, Trinidad and Tobago
Trinidad and Tobago expatriate footballers
Trinidad and Tobago expatriate sportspeople in the United States
Trinidad and Tobago footballers
USL First Division players
Year of birth missing (living people)